Between a rock and a hard place, or simply a rock and a hard place, is an expression meaning having to choose between two difficult options. It may also refer to:


Literature
A Rock and a Hard Place, a 1988 Vietnam War novel by David Sherman
A Rock and a Hard Place: One Boy's Triumphant Story, a 1993 memoir considered to be a literary hoax, supposedly by Anthony Godby Johnson
 Between a Rock and a Hard Place (book), a 2004 autobiography by Aron Ralston

Music
 Between a Rock and a Hard Place (Australian Crawl album), 1985
 Between a Rock and a Hard Place (Artifacts album), 1994
 A Rock and a Hard Place, a song by Sisters of Mercy from their 1985 album First and Last and Always
 "Rock and a Hard Place", a 1989 single by the Rolling Stones
 "(Between A) Rock and a Hard Place", a song by Cutting Crew from their 1989 album The Scattering
 "Rock and a Hard Place" (Bailey Zimmerman song), a 2022 song by Bailey Zimmerman

Television
 "A Rock and a Hard Place", a 1997 episode of Hercules: The Legendary Journeys
 "Between a Rock and a Hard Place", a 2009 episode of Make It or Break It
 "Rock and a Hard Place", a 2013 episode of Supernatural
 "Rock and Hard Place", a 2022 episode of Better Call Saul

See also 
 Between Iraq and a Hard Place, a 2003 album by the Capitol Steps
Rock in a Hard Place, a 1982 album by Aerosmith